Stephen Carr Smith (born February 2, 1961) is an American baseball coach and former pitcher. He is the upper-level pitching coordinator for the Detroit Tigers. He played college baseball at Baylor University from 1982 to 1983. He was the head coach at Baylor (1995–2015) and Tennessee Tech (2020–2021).

Early life
Smith graduated from Gulfport High School in Gulfport, Mississippi, in 1979. While in high school, Smith played quarterback for the football team, leading Gulfport to the 1978 state championship, and pitcher for the baseball team, playing in the 1979 Mississippi High School All-Star Game.

College career
Smith went on to attend Mississippi College where was played quarterback for the football team and pitcher for the baseball team. He transferred to Baylor University after two seasons, where he pitched for the Baylor Bears baseball team under Mickey Sullivan. In 1982, Smith led the Southwest Conference with a 1.72 ERA. He was drafted by the San Francisco Giants in the fifth round of the 1983 Major League Baseball Draft.

Minor league career
Smith began his professional career in 1983 with the Rookie League Great Falls Giants of the Pioneer League. He spent the 1984 season with the Class A Fresno Giants of the California League and the Class AA Shreveport Captains of the Texas League. Smith spent the entire 1985 season as well as most of the 1986 season with the Fresno Giants before being called up to the Class AAA Phoenix Firebirds of the Pacific Coast League.

Coaching career
Smith's coaching career began as a graduate assistant for the Texas A&M Aggies baseball team in 1988. After two seasons at Texas A&M, Smith became an assistant coach for the Mississippi State Bulldogs baseball team in 1990, helping lead the Bulldogs to the 1990 College World Series. Upon Mickey Sullivan's retirement from Baylor University following the 1994 season, Smith became the head coach for the Baylor Bears baseball team.

In 1998, Smith led Baylor back to the NCAA Division I Baseball Championship for the first time since 1993. In 2000, Smith led Baylor to a Big 12 Conference championship, Baylor's first conference championship in baseball since 1966. Smith would lead Baylor to subsequent Big 12 championships in 2005 and 2012.

In 2005, Smith led Baylor to the College World Series for the first time since 1978.

With a win over Texas A&M University-Corpus Christi on April 17, 2012, Smith passed Sullivan to become the winningest coach in Baylor history.

Smith has had 67 players selection in the Major League Baseball Draft, including six first round draft choices in Kip Wells, Jason Jennings, Chad Hawkins, David Murphy, Mark McCormack and Aaron Miller. Twelve Baylor players have earned All-American honors under Smith, with Jason Jennings winning the Golden Spikes Award, Dick Howser Trophy and Rotary Smith Award as the best player in college baseball, and Kelly Shoppach winning the Johnny Bench Award as the best catcher in college baseball. 39 players have earned first-team All-Conference honors under Smith, with Jason Jennings, Kelly Shoppach and Josh Ludy earning Big 12 Conference Baseball Player of the Year honors.

In 2012, the Bears won 49 games and hosted a Super Regional, but proceeded to have three losing seasons after that. Smith was fired after the 2015 season.

In 2017, Smith served as an Assistant Baseball Coach at Santa Clara University. In August 2017, Smith accepted a role of volunteer assistant and pitching coach at Auburn University.

On December 21, 2019, Smith accepted the position of head baseball coach at Tennessee Technological University. After just two seasons, Smith left Tennessee Tech for a job with the Detroit Tigers.

Head coaching record

References

1961 births
Living people
American football quarterbacks
Baseball pitchers
Auburn Tigers baseball coaches
Baylor Bears baseball coaches
Baylor Bears baseball players
Mississippi College Choctaws baseball players
Mississippi College Choctaws football players
Mississippi State Bulldogs baseball coaches
Tennessee Tech Golden Eagles baseball coaches
Texas A&M Aggies baseball coaches
Santa Clara Broncos baseball coaches
Sportspeople from Waco, Texas